The Gryazev-Shipunov GSh-30-2 (ГШ-30-2) or GSh-2-30 is a Soviet  dual-barrel autocannon developed for use on certain ground attack military aircraft and helicopters.

The cannon is not related to the Gryazev-Shipunov GSh-30-1, but is a  recoil-operated cannon using the Gast principle, like the Gryazev-Shipunov GSh-23L.

The GSh-30-2 was designed for the Sukhoi Su-25 ground attack plane, it can also be carried in external gun pods and mounted on the pakistani-chinese JF-17 Thunder. It measures 2,044 × 222 × 195 mm, with a barrel length of 1500 mm and a weight of 105 kg. The GSh-30K is a modified version with 2400 mm long water-cooled barrels, a variable rate of fire, and dimensions of 2,944 × 222 × 195 mm. It is used on a fixed mounting on late model Mil Mi-24 helicopters, e.g. the Mi-24P.

Variants
 GSh-30-2
 GSh-30-2K

Specifications (GSh-30-2)
 Manufacturer: KBP Instrument Design Bureau
 Type: dual-barrel autocannon
 Caliber: 30×165 mm, electrically primed
 Operation: recoil operation
 Length: 2,044 mm
 Barrel Length: 1,500 mm
 Weight (complete): 105 kg
 Rate of fire: 1,000–3,000 rpm
 Muzzle velocity: 870 m/s
 Projectile weight: 390 g
 Mounting platforms: Sukhoi Su-25 "Frogfoot"

Specifications (GSh-30-2K)
 Manufacturer: KBP Instrument Design Bureau
 Type: dual-barrel autocannon
 Caliber: 30×165 mm
 Operation: recoil operation
 Length: 2,944 mm
 Barrel Length: 2,400 mm
 Weight (complete): 126 kg
 Rate of fire: 300 rpm (low) – 2,000–2,600 rpm (high)
 Muzzle velocity: 940 m/s
 Projectile weight: 390 g
 Mounting platforms: Mil Mi-24P "Hind", Sukhoi Su-25 “Frogfoot”

See also
 List of Russian weaponry
 List of multiple-barrel firearms

Users

References

Sources

External links

 The Russian Ammunition Page
 Modern Fighter Gun Effectiveness

Artillery of Russia
30 mm artillery
Aircraft guns of the Soviet Union
Autocannons of the Soviet Union
KBP Instrument Design Bureau products
Military equipment introduced in the 1980s